is a Shingon temple in Matsuyama, Ehime Prefecture, Japan. It is Temple 51 on the Shikoku 88 temple pilgrimage. Its name means Stone Hand Temple (石手寺). Seven of its structures have been designated National Treasures or Important Cultural Properties.

History
The temple of Annoyō-ji was founded by Gyōki, and converted from a Hossō to a Shingon temple by Kūkai. Rebuilt by the ruler of Iyo Province in the eighth century, many of the temple buildings were destroyed by the Chōsokabe in the sixteenth century. The aetiology sees the temple's name changed to Ishite-ji or stone-hand temple after the tightly-clenched hand of the newborn son of the lord of Iyo Province was opened by a priest from the Annoyō-ji to reveal a stone inscribed "Emon Saburō is reborn".

Buildings
  (1318) (National Treasure)
  (late Kamakura period) (Important Cultural Property)
  (late Kamakura period) (ICP)
  (late Kamakura period) (ICP)
  (1333) (ICP)
  (Nanboku-chō period) (ICP)

Treasures
  (late Kamakura Period) (Important Cultural Property)
  (1251) (ICP)
 Inscription of 1567 telling the legend of Emon Saburō
 Casket housing the eponymous stone.

See also

Shikoku 88 temple pilgrimage
Kūkai
List of National Treasures of Japan (temples)

Notes

References
 Banzai, Mayumi. (1973). A Pilgrimage to the 88 Temples in Shikoku Island. Tokyo: Kodansha.  OCLC 969829
 Miyata, Taisen. (2006). The 88 Temples of Shikoku Island, Japan. Los Angeles: Koyasan Buddhist Temple.  OCLC 740530179
 Reader, Ian. (2005). Making Pilgrimages: Meaning and Practice in Shikoku. Honolulu: University of Hawaii Press.  ;  OCLC 56050925

Buddhist temples in Ehime Prefecture
Pagodas in Japan
National Treasures of Japan
Important Cultural Properties of Japan
Shingon Buddhism
Buddhist pilgrimage sites in Japan